Lorentz Scott Bruun (born May 3, 1966) is an American Republican politician from the US state of Oregon. He served in the Oregon House of Representatives representing District 37, which encompasses some of the southern suburbs of Portland, Oregon, including part or all of the cities of Durham, Lake Oswego, Rivergrove, Tualatin and West Linn, as well as the hamlet of Stafford and parts of unincorporated Clackamas County.

Early life and career
Bruun grew up in Portland, Oregon and graduated from Lincoln High School. He earned a bachelor's degree in political science from the University of Oregon in 1988 and an MBA from Portland State University in 1992. He worked as a commercial and corporate banker for more than ten years before joining his family's general contracting company Lorentz Bruun as vice president and chief financial officer.

Political campaigns

1996
In April 1996, Bruun sought the Republican nomination for a special election to complete the term for the United States House of Representatives seat in Oregon's 3rd congressional district, vacated when Ron Wyden won election to the United States Senate. Bruun lost the Republican primary to Mark Brunelle, who then lost the special election to Earl Blumenauer. However, Bruun was unopposed for the Republican nomination for the November election for the full term because Brunelle failed to register for the May primary. Blumenauer went on to defeat Bruun to win re-election to the seat.

2004, 2006, 2008
In 2004, Bruun won a close election for a vacant seat in the Oregon House of Representatives over Jim Morton. He was re-elected in 2006, and again in 2008, facing Democratic West Linn city councilor Michele Eberle.

2010

In May 2010, Bruun won the Republican nomination against Fred Thompson.

Personal
Bruun and his wife Alison live in West Linn with their two children and is a principal at Hubbell Communications, a public relations firm in Portland.

References

External links
 Legislative website
 Project VoteSmart biography
 Campaign website

Members of the Oregon House of Representatives
Portland, Oregon Republicans
University of Oregon alumni
Portland State University alumni
Politicians from West Linn, Oregon
Living people
1966 births
21st-century American politicians